Home & Minor is an EP by Manchester-based alternative rock band Oceansize, released on 26 October 2009 on Superball Music. The release is limited to 3000 copies. Regarding the EP, vocalist and guitarist Mike Vennart states, "we thought we’d try and make a mini-album of more reserved songs that have something in common with each other. It's our acoustic-like record, only there are no acoustic instruments and it’s not an album!"

Background and information
According to the band, the EP is

In an interview with Rock Sound, Vennart elaborated on the stylistic approach of the record, describing the track "Legal Teens" as "a weird, sci-fi, cocktail tune."

Track listing
Music by Oceansize. Lyrics by Mike Vennart. 
 "Legal Teens" - 4:28
 "Getting Where Water Cannot" - 5:24
 "Monodrones" - 2:34
 "Home & Minor" - 8:10
 "Didnaeland" - 3:22
 "The Strand" - 8:04

Personnel
The following people contributed to Home & Minor:

Oceansize
Steve Durose - guitar, backing vocals
Richard "Gambler" Ingram - guitar, keyboards
Mark Heron - drums, percussion
Steven Hodson - bass, keyboards
Mike Vennart - lead vocals, guitar

Additional musicians
Tom Knott - trumpet
Norman McLeod - pedal steel guitar
Kate Ray - vocals

Recording personnel
Oceansize - recording, producer
Chris Sheldon - mixing
Sean Magee - mastering

Artwork
Steven Hodson - artwork, layout
Adam Crosby - cover photograph

References

2009 EPs
Oceansize albums
Superball Music albums